Jahlani Karl Tavai (born September 28, 1996) is an American football linebacker for the New England Patriots of the National Football League (NFL). He is the younger brother of J. R. Tavai. He played college football at Hawaii.

College career

College statistics

Professional career

Detroit Lions
Tavai was drafted by the Detroit Lions in the second round (43rd overall) of the 2019 NFL Draft. He played in 15 games in six starts, recording 58 tackles, two sacks, a forced fumble, two passes defensed and an interception. He suffered a shoulder injury in Week 16 and was placed on injured reserve on December 23, 2019.

On August 31, 2021, Tavai was waived by the Detroit Lions as part of the final pre-season roster cuts.

New England Patriots
After being released by Detroit, on September 1, 2021, the New England Patriots signed Tavai to their practice squad, eventually activating him, while reuniting with Matt Patricia, his former head coach in Detroit. He was promoted to the active roster on October 13.

Tavai began the 2022 season as a backup linebacker. He was named a starter in Week 5 and remained there the rest of the season. On November 29, 2022, Tavai signed a two-year, $4.4 million contract extension with the Patriots. He finished the season with 69 tackles, 1.5 sacks, and two passes defensed.

References

External links
Hawaii Rainbow Warriors bio

1996 births
Living people
American football linebackers
Detroit Lions players
Hawaii Rainbow Warriors football players
New England Patriots players
Players of American football from Inglewood, California